The Brave Archer and His Mate, also known as The Brave Archer 4 and Mysterious Island, is a 1982 Hong Kong film adapted from Louis Cha's novels The Legend of the Condor Heroes and The Return of the Condor Heroes. Together with Little Dragon Maiden (1983), The Brave Archer and His Mate is regarded as an unofficial sequel to the Brave Archer film trilogy (The Brave Archer, The Brave Archer 2 and The Brave Archer 3).

Cast
 Alexander Fu Sheng as Yang Guo
 Philip Kwok as Guo Jing
 Gigi Wong as Huang Rong
 Lung Tien-hsiang as Yang Kang
 Lam Sau-kwan as Mu Nianci
 Wen Hsueh-erh as Guo Fu
 Wong Lik as Ouyang Feng
 Kwan Fung as Huang Yaoshi
 Chin Siu-ho as Wu Xiuwen
 Lau Fong-sai as Wu Dunru
 Chiang Sheng as Huodu
 Danny Lee as Ouyang Ke
 Chu Ko as Da'erba
 Chan Shen as Ke Zhen'e
 Chow Kin-ping as Zhu Cong
 Wan Seung-lam as Han Baoju
 Wong Wa as Nan Xiren
 Ching Li as Han Xiaoying
 Lu Feng as Zhao Zhijing
 Hung Fung as Hao Datong
 Wai Wang as Qiu Chuji
 Wang Han-chen as Ma Yu
 Wong Ching-ho as Wang Chuyi
 Ngai Tim-choi
 Siao Yuk
 Lam Chi-tai
 Yu Tai-ping
 Wong Siu-ming
 Lam Wai
 Hung San-nam
 Chan Tak-hoi
 Ting Tung
 Choi Kwok-keung
 Ailen Sit

External links
 
 

1982 films
Hong Kong martial arts films
1980s Mandarin-language films
Kung fu films
Shaw Brothers Studio films
Films based on The Return of the Condor Heroes
Wuxia films
Films set in the Jin dynasty (1115–1234)
Films set in the Mongol Empire
Films directed by Chang Cheh
1980s Hong Kong films